Sara Reiling-Hildebrand (born September 18, 1979) is an American diver. She competed at the 2000 Summer Olympics in Sydney, in the women's 10 metre platform. She competed at the 2004 Summer Olympics in Athens, in the women's 10 metre platform and the women's synchronized 10 metre platform.

In 2006, Hildebrand was hired as the first diving coach at Florida Gulf Coast University.

References

1979 births
Living people
American female divers
Olympic divers of the United States
Divers at the 2000 Summer Olympics
Divers at the 2004 Summer Olympics
Pan American Games medalists in diving
Pan American Games bronze medalists for the United States
Divers at the 2003 Pan American Games
Universiade medalists in diving
Universiade bronze medalists for the United States
Medalists at the 2003 Pan American Games
21st-century American women